The Union of Orthodox Synagogues (UOS) is the coordinating body of Orthodox Synagogues in South Africa.

Activities 
 The UOS maintains a Beth Din, The Johannesburg Beth Din
 The Office of the Chief Rabbi Dr. Warren Goldstein 
 The Kashrut Division supervises the production of kosher foodstuffs
 Fights missionaries through Jews for Judaism
 Publishes a magazine Jewish Tradition
 Maintains a Community Development Division helping affiliated synagogues develop and grow.
 Hosts The Sinai Indaba - an annual Torah convention featuring international Jewish thinkers and leaders.

Chief Rabbis
Judah Leo Landau (1915–1942)
Louis Rabinowitz (1945–1961)
Bernard M. Casper (1963–1987)
Cyril Harris (1988–2004)
Warren Goldstein (2005–)

References

Kosher food certification organizations
Orthodox Judaism in South Africa
Religion in South Africa